Mount Freshfield is located on the border of Alberta and British Columbia. It was named in 1897  by J. Norman Collie after Douglas Freshfield.

See also
List of peaks on the British Columbia–Alberta border

References

Canadian Rockies
Mountains of Banff National Park
Three-thousanders of Alberta
Three-thousanders of British Columbia